Ceyhun Eriş (born 15 May 1977) is a Turkish retired professional footballer who played as an attacking midfielder.

Club career
Eriş began his professional career with local club Galatasaray in 1995. He made his cup debut against Denizlispor on 14 December 1995, and made his league debut against the same club a week later. Çaykur Rizespor loaned the youngster for the 1996–97 season, where he made 27 appearances and scored three goals. After returning to Galatasaray, Eriş continued playing for the youth team. He was loaned out to Göztepe for two consecutive seasons, and left Galatasaray for Siirtspor in 1999. He made three appearances for the Istanbul-based club during his four-year tenure. After scoring 24 goals in 54 matches in the TFF Second League with Siirtspor, he moved to Fenerbahçe. Eriş spent two years with the club before transferring to MKE Ankaragücü in 2003. City rivals Gençlerbirliği transferred him the following season. He would continue moving clubs, playing for seven clubs over a five-year span from 2005 to 2010, transferring twice to Konyaspor and MKE Ankaragücü. He transferred to Sivasspor in 2010 and was transferred to Denizlispor in 2011.

International career
He won his first international cap for Turkey at the age of 32, when he started a 2010 World Cup qualifier against Belgium on 10 October 2009.

See also
Ceyhun Eriş: "Gençler kendi önlerini açacak"  An extensive interview with the Turkish Football Federation website.

References

External links
 
 Turkish Football Federation profile
 
 
 Ceyhun Eriş: "Gençler kendi önlerini açacak" 

1977 births
Living people
Association football midfielders
Footballers from Istanbul
Turkish footballers
Turkey international footballers
Turkey B international footballers
Turkey under-21 international footballers
Süper Lig players
K League 1 players
Turkish expatriate footballers
Turkish expatriate sportspeople in South Korea
Turkish expatriate sportspeople in Sweden
Expatriate footballers in South Korea
Expatriate footballers in Sweden
Galatasaray S.K. footballers
Çaykur Rizespor footballers
Göztepe S.K. footballers
Siirtspor footballers
Fenerbahçe S.K. footballers
MKE Ankaragücü footballers
Gençlerbirliği S.K. footballers
Konyaspor footballers
Samsunspor footballers
Trabzonspor footballers
FC Seoul players
Assyriska FF players
Sivasspor footballers
Denizlispor footballers
Superettan players